"Foundling-Bird" is a German fairy tale collected by the Brothers Grimm, number 51.

It is Aarne–Thompson type 313A, the girl helps the hero flee, and revolves about a transformation chase. Others of the type include 
The Master Maid, The Water Nixie, Nix Nought Nothing, and The Two Kings' Children.

Synopsis

A forester found a baby in a bird's nest and brought him back to be raised with his daughter Lenchen. They called the child Fundevogel or Foundling-Bird, and he and Lenchen loved each other.

One day Lenchen saw the cook carrying many buckets of water to the house and asked what she was doing. The cook told her that the next day, she would boil Fundevogel in it. Lenchen went and told Fundevogel, and they fled.

The cook, afraid of what the forester would say about his lost daughter, sent servants after them. Fundevogel transformed into a rosebush and Lenchen a rose on it, and the servants went back empty-handed. When they told the cook they had seen nothing but the rosebush and the rose, she scolded them for not bringing back the rose. They went again, and Fundevogel became a church, and Lenchen a chandelier in it. They returned and told the cook what they had seen, and she scolded them for not bringing back the chandelier.

The cook set out herself. Fundevogel turned into a pond and Lenchen a duck on it. The cook knelt down to drink up the pool, but Lenchen caught her head and drew her into the pond to drown.

The children went safely home again.

See also

Farmer Weathersky
King Kojata
The Prince Who Wanted to See the World
The Witch

References

External links
Fundevogel online audiobook
Foundling-Bird with links to related stories

Grimms' Fairy Tales
Fiction about shapeshifting
Fiction about magic
Fictional birds
ATU 300-399